Iconoclasm (from Greek:  + ) is the social belief in the importance of the destruction of icons and other images or monuments, most frequently for religious or political reasons. People who engage in or support iconoclasm are called iconoclasts, a term that has come to be figuratively applied to any individual who challenges "cherished beliefs or venerated institutions on the grounds that they are erroneous or pernicious."

Conversely, one who reveres or venerates religious images is called (by iconoclasts) an iconolater; in a Byzantine context, such a person is called an iconodule or iconophile. Iconoclasm does not generally encompass the destruction of the images of a specific ruler after his or her death or overthrow, a practice better known as damnatio memoriae.

While iconoclasm may be carried out by adherents of a different religion, it is more commonly the result of sectarian disputes between factions of the same religion. The term originates from the Byzantine Iconoclasm, the struggles between proponents and opponents of religious icons in the Byzantine Empire from 726 to 842 AD. Degrees of iconoclasm vary greatly among religions and their branches, but are strongest in religions which oppose idolatry, including the Abrahamic religions. Outside of the religious context, iconoclasm can refer to movements for widespread destruction in symbols of an ideology or cause, such as the destruction of monarchist symbols during the French Revolution.

Early religious iconoclasm

Ancient era

In the Bronze Age, the most significant episode of iconoclasm occurred in Egypt during the Amarna Period, when Akhenaten, based in his new capital of Akhetaten, instituted a significant shift in Egyptian artistic styles alongside a campaign of intolerance towards the traditional gods and a new emphasis on a state monolatristic tradition focused on the god Aten, the Sun disk—many temples and monuments were destroyed as a result:

In rebellion against the old religion and the powerful priests of Amun, Akhenaten ordered the eradication of all of Egypt's traditional gods. He sent royal officials to chisel out and destroy every reference to Amun and the names of other deities on tombs, temple walls, and cartouches to instill in the people that the Aten was the one true god.

Public references to Akhenaten were destroyed soon after his death. Comparing the ancient Egyptians with the Israelites, Jan Assmann writes:

For Egypt, the greatest horror was the destruction or abduction of the cult images. In the eyes of the Israelites, the erection of images meant the destruction of divine presence; in the eyes of the Egyptians, this same effect was attained by the destruction of images. In Egypt, iconoclasm was the most terrible religious crime; in Israel, the most terrible religious crime was idolatry. In this respect Osarseph alias Akhenaten, the iconoclast, and the Golden Calf, the paragon of idolatry, correspond to each other inversely, and it is strange that Aaron could so easily avoid the role of the religious criminal. It is more than probable that these traditions evolved under mutual influence. In this respect, Moses and Akhenaten became, after all, closely related.

Judaism 
According to the Hebrew Bible, God instructed the Israelites to "destroy all [the] engraved stones, destroy all [the] molded images, and demolish all [the] high places" of the indigenous Canaanite population as soon as they entered the Promised Land.

In Judaism, King Hezekiah purged Solomon's Temple in Jerusalem and all figures were also destroyed in the Land of Israel, including the Nehushtan, as recorded in the Second Book of Kings. His reforms were reversed in the reign of his son Manasseh.

Iconoclasm in Christian history 

Scattered expressions of opposition to the use of images have been reported: in 305–306 AD, the Synod of Elvira appeared to endorse iconoclasm; Canon 36 states, "Pictures are not to be placed in churches, so that they do not become objects of worship and adoration." Proscription ceased after the destruction of pagan temples. However, widespread use of Christian iconography only began as Christianity increasingly spread among gentiles after the legalization of Christianity by Roman Emperor Constantine (c. 312 AD). During the process of Christianisation under Constantine, Christian groups destroyed the images and sculptures expressive of the Roman Empire's polytheist state religion.

Among early church theologians, iconoclastic tendencies were supported by theologians such as: Tertullian, Clement of Alexandria, Origen, Lactantius, Justin Martyr, Eusebius and Epiphanus.

Byzantine era 
The period after the reign of Byzantine Emperor Justinian (527–565) evidently saw a huge increase in the use of images, both in volume and quality, and a gathering aniconic reaction.

One notable change within the Byzantine Empire came in 695, when Justinian II's government added a full-face image of Christ on the obverse of imperial gold coins. The change caused the Caliph Abd al-Malik to stop his earlier adoption of Byzantine coin types. He started a purely Islamic coinage with lettering only. A letter by the Patriarch Germanus, written before 726 to two iconoclast bishops, says that "now whole towns and multitudes of people are in considerable agitation over this matter," but there is little written evidence of the debate.

Government-led iconoclasm began with Byzantine Emperor Leo III, who issued a series of edicts between 726 and 730 against the veneration of images. The religious conflict created political and economic divisions in Byzantine society; iconoclasm was generally supported by the Eastern, poorer, non-Greek peoples of the Empire who had to frequently deal with raids from the new Muslim Empire. On the other hand, the wealthier Greeks of Constantinople and the peoples of the Balkan and Italian provinces strongly opposed iconoclasm.

Pre-Reformation 
Peter of Bruys opposed the usage of religious images, the Strigolniki were also possibly iconoclastic. Claudius of Turin was the bishop of Turin from 817 until his death. He is most noted for teaching iconoclasm.

Reformation era

The first iconoclastic wave happened in Wittenberg in the early 1520s under reformers Thomas Müntzer and Andreas Karlstadt, in the absence of Martin Luther, who then, concealed under the pen-name of 'Junker Jörg',  intervened to calm things down. Luther argued that the mental picturing of Christ when reading the Scriptures was similar in character to artistic renderings of Christ.

In contrast to the Lutherans who favoured certain types of sacred art in their churches and homes, the Reformed (Calvinist) leaders, in particular Andreas Karlstadt, Huldrych Zwingli and John Calvin, encouraged the removal of religious images by invoking the Decalogue's prohibition of idolatry and the manufacture of graven (sculpted) images of God. As a result, individuals attacked statues and images, most famously in the beeldenstorm across the Netherlands in 1566.  However, in most cases, civil authorities removed images in an orderly manner in the newly Reformed Protestant cities and territories of Europe.

The belief of iconoclasm caused havoc throughout Europe. In 1523, specifically due to the Swiss reformer Huldrych Zwingli, a vast number of his followers viewed themselves as being involved in a spiritual community that in matters of faith should obey neither the visible Church nor lay authorities. According to Peter George Wallace "Zwingli's attack on images, at the first debate, triggered iconoclastic incidents in Zurich and the villages under civic jurisdiction that the reformer was unwilling to condone." Due to this action of protest against authority, "Zwingli responded with a carefully reasoned treatise that men could not live in society without laws and constraint."

Significant iconoclastic riots took place in Basel (in 1529), Zurich (1523), Copenhagen (1530), Münster (1534), Geneva (1535), Augsburg (1537), Scotland (1559), Rouen (1560), and Saintes and La Rochelle (1562). Calvinist iconoclasm in Europe "provoked reactive riots by Lutheran mobs" in Germany and "antagonized the neighbouring Eastern Orthodox" in the Baltic region.

The Seventeen Provinces (now the Netherlands, Belgium, and parts of Northern France) were disrupted by widespread Calvinist iconoclasm in the summer of 1566. This period, known as the Beeldenstorm, began with the destruction of the statuary of the Monastery of Saint Lawrence in Steenvoorde after a "Hagenpreek," or field sermon, by Sebastiaan Matte on 10 August 1566; by October the wave of furor had gone all through the Spanish Netherlands up to Groningen. Hundreds of other attacks included the sacking of the Monastery of Saint Anthony after a sermon by Jacob de Buysere. The Beeldenstorm marked the start of the revolution against the Spanish forces and the Catholic Church.

During the Reformation in England, which started during the reign of Anglican monarch Henry VIII, and was urged on by reformers such as Hugh Latimer and Thomas Cranmer, limited official action was taken against religious images in churches in the late 1530s. Henry's young son, Edward VI, came to the throne in 1547 and, under Cranmer's guidance, issued injunctions for Religious Reforms in the same year and in 1550, an Act of Parliament "for the abolition and putting away of divers books and images." During the English Civil War, Bishop Joseph Hall of Norwich described the events of 1643 when troops and citizens, encouraged by a Parliamentary ordinance against superstition and idolatry, behaved thus:

Lord what work was here! What clattering of glasses! What beating down of walls! What tearing up of monuments! What pulling down of seats! What wresting out of irons and brass from the windows! What defacing of arms! What demolishing of curious stonework! What tooting and piping upon organ pipes! And what a hideous triumph in the market-place before all the country, when all the mangled organ pipes, vestments, both copes and surplices, together with the leaden cross which had newly been sawn down from the Green-yard pulpit and the service-books and singing books that could be carried to the fire in the public market-place were heaped together.

Protestant Christianity was not uniformly hostile to the use of religious images. Martin Luther taught the "importance of images as tools for instruction and aids to devotion," stating: "If it is not a sin but good to have the image of Christ in my heart, why should it be a sin to have it in my eyes?" Lutheran churches retained ornate church interiors with a prominent crucifix, reflecting their high view of the real presence of Christ in Eucharist. As such, "Lutheran worship became a complex ritual choreography set in a richly furnished church interior." For Lutherans, "the Reformation renewed rather than removed the religious image."

Lutheran scholar Jeremiah Ohl writes:Zwingli and others for the sake of saving the Word rejected all plastic art; Luther, with an equal concern for the Word, but far more conservative, would have all the arts to be the servants of the Gospel. "I am not of the opinion" said [Luther], "that through the Gospel all the arts should be banished and driven away, as some zealots want to make us believe; but I wish to see them all, especially music, in the service of Him Who gave and created them." Again he says: "I have myself heard those who oppose pictures, read from my German Bible.… But this contains many pictures of God, of the angels, of men, and of animals, especially in the Revelation of St. John, in the books of Moses, and in the book of Joshua. We therefore kindly beg these fanatics to permit us also to paint these pictures on the wall that they may be remembered and better understood, inasmuch as they can harm as little on the walls as in books. Would to God that I could persuade those who can afford it to paint the whole Bible on their houses, inside and outside, so that all might see; this would indeed be a Christian work. For I am convinced that it is God's will that we should hear and learn what He has done, especially what Christ suffered. But when I hear these things and meditate upon them, I find it impossible not to picture them in my heart. Whether I want to or not, when I hear, of Christ, a human form hanging upon a cross rises up in my heart: just as I see my natural face reflected when I look into water. Now if it is not sinful for me to have Christ's picture in my heart, why should it be sinful to have it before my eyes?The Ottoman Sultan Suleiman the Magnificent, who had pragmatic reasons to support the Dutch Revolt (the rebels, like himself, were fighting against Spain) also completely approved of their act of "destroying idols," which accorded well with Muslim teachings.

A bit later in Dutch history, in 1627 the artist Johannes van der Beeck was arrested and tortured, charged with being a religious non-conformist and a blasphemer, heretic, atheist, and Satanist. The 25 January 1628 judgment from five noted advocates of The Hague pronounced him guilty of "blasphemy against God and avowed atheism, at the same time as leading a frightful and pernicious lifestyle. At the court's order his paintings were burned, and only a few of them survive."

Other instances 
From the 16th through the 19th centuries, many of the polytheistic religious deities and texts of pre-colonial Americas, Oceania, and Africa were destroyed by Christian missionaries and their converts, such as during the Spanish conquest of the Aztec Empire and the Spanish conquest of the Inca Empire.

Many of the moai of Easter Island were toppled during the 18th century in the iconoclasm of civil wars before any European encounter. Other instances of iconoclasm may have occurred throughout Eastern Polynesia during its conversion to Christianity in the 19th century.

After the Second Vatican Council in the late 20th century, some Roman Catholic parish churches discarded much of their traditional imagery, art, and architecture.

Muslim iconoclasm

Islam has a much stronger tradition of forbidding the depiction of figures, especially religious figures, with Sunni Islam forbidding it more than Shia Islam.
In the history of Islam, the act of removing idols from the Ka'ba in Mecca has great symbolic and historic importance for all believers.

In general, Muslim societies have avoided the depiction of living beings (both animals and humans) within such sacred spaces as mosques and madrasahs. This ban on figural representation is not based on the Qur'an, instead, it is based on traditions which are described within the Hadith. The prohibition of figuration has not always been extended to the secular sphere, and a robust tradition of figural representation exists within Muslim art.
However, Western authors have tended to perceive "a long, culturally determined, and unchanging tradition of violent iconoclastic acts" within Islamic society.

Early Islam in Arabia 
The first act of Muslim iconoclasm dates to the beginning of Islam, in 630, when the various statues of Arabian deities housed in the Kaaba in Mecca were destroyed. There is a tradition that Muhammad spared a fresco of Mary and Jesus. This act was intended to bring an end to the idolatry which, in the Muslim view, characterized Jahiliyyah.

The destruction of the idols of Mecca did not, however, determine the treatment of other religious communities living under Muslim rule after the expansion of the caliphate. Most Christians under Muslim rule, for example, continued to produce icons and to decorate their churches as they wished. A major exception to this pattern of tolerance in early Islamic history was the "Edict of Yazīd", issued by the Umayyad caliph Yazīd II in 722–723. This edict ordered the destruction of crosses and Christian images within the territory of the caliphate. Researchers have discovered evidence that the order was followed, particularly in present-day Jordan, where archaeological evidence shows the removal of images from the mosaic floors of some, although not all, of the churches that stood at this time. But Yazīd's iconoclastic policies were not continued by his successors, and Christian communities of the Levant continued to make icons without significant interruption from the sixth century to the ninth.

Egypt 
 Al-Maqrīzī, writing in the 15th century, attributes the missing nose on the Great Sphinx of Giza to iconoclasm by Muhammad Sa'im al-Dahr, a Sufi Muslim in the mid-1300s. He was reportedly outraged by local Muslims making offerings to the Great Sphinx in the hope of controlling the flood cycle, and he was later executed for vandalism. However, whether this was actually the cause of the missing nose has been debated by historians. Mark Lehner, having performed an archaeological study, concluded that it was broken with instruments at an earlier unknown time between the 3rd and 10th centuries.

Ottoman conquests 
Certain conquering Muslim armies have used local temples or houses of worship as mosques. An example is Hagia Sophia in Istanbul (formerly Constantinople), which was converted into a mosque in 1453. Most icons were desecrated and the rest were covered with plaster. In the 1934 the government of Turkey decided to convert the Hagia Sophia into a museum and the restoration of the mosaics was undertaken by the American Byzantine Institute beginning in 1932.

Contemporary events 

Certain Muslim denominations continue to pursue iconoclastic agendas. There has been much controversy within Islam over the recent and apparently on-going destruction of historic sites by Saudi Arabian authorities, prompted by the fear they could become the subject of "idolatry."

A recent act of iconoclasm was the 2001 destruction of the giant Buddhas of Bamyan by the then-Taliban government of Afghanistan. The act generated worldwide protests and was not supported by other Muslim governments and organizations. It was widely perceived in the Western media as a result of the Muslim prohibition against figural decoration. Such an account overlooks "the coexistence between the Buddhas and the Muslim population that marveled at them for over a millennium" before their destruction. According to art historian F. B. Flood, analysis of the Taliban's statements regarding the Buddhas suggest that their destruction was motivated more by political than by theological concerns. Taliban spokespeople have given many different explanations of the motives for the destruction.

During the Tuareg rebellion of 2012, the radical Islamist militia Ansar Dine destroyed various Sufi shrines from the 15th and 16th centuries in the city of Timbuktu, Mali. In 2016, the International Criminal Court (ICC) sentenced Ahmad al-Faqi al-Mahdi, a former member of Ansar Dine, to nine years in prison for this destruction of cultural world heritage. This was the first time that the ICC convicted a person for such a crime.

The short-lived Islamic State of Iraq and the Levant carried out iconoclastic attacks such as the destruction of Shia mosques and shrines. Notable incidents include blowing up the Mosque of the Prophet Yunus (Jonah) and destroying the Shrine to Seth in Mosul.

Iconoclasm in India

In early Medieval India, there were numerous recorded instances of temple desecration by Indian kings against rival Indian kingdoms, which involved conflicts between devotees of different Hindu deities, as well as conflicts between Hindus, Buddhists, and Jains.

In 642, the Pallava king Narasimhavarman I looted a Ganesha temple in the Chalukyan capital of Vatapi. In c. 692, Chalukya armies invaded northern India where they looted temples of Ganga and Yamuna.

In the 8th century, Bengali troops from the Buddhist Pala Empire desecrated temples of Vishnu, the state deity of Lalitaditya's kingdom in Kashmir. In the early 9th century, Indian Hindu kings from Kanchipuram and the Pandyan king Srimara Srivallabha looted Buddhist temples in Sri Lanka. In the early 10th century, the Pratihara king Herambapala looted an image from a temple in the Sahi kingdom of Kangra, which was later looted by the Pratihara king Yashovarman.

During the Muslim conquest of Sindh 
Records from the campaign recorded in the Chach Nama record the destruction of temples during the early 8th century when the Umayyad governor of Damascus, al-Hajjaj ibn Yusuf, mobilized an expedition of 6000 cavalry under Muhammad bin Qasim in 712.

Historian Upendra Thakur records the persecution of Hindus and Buddhists:

The Somnath temple and Mahmud of Ghazni 
Perhaps the most notorious episode of iconoclasm in India was Mahmud of Ghazni's attack on the Somnath Temple from across the Thar Desert. The temple was first raided in 725, when Junayad, the governor of Sind, sent his armies to destroy it. In 1024, during the reign of Bhima I, the prominent Turkic-Muslim ruler Mahmud of Ghazni raided Gujarat, plundering the Somnath Temple and breaking its jyotirlinga despite pleas by Brahmins not to break it. He took away a booty of 20 million dinars. The attack may have been inspired by the belief that an idol of the goddess Manat had been secretly transferred to the temple. According to the Ghaznavid court-poet Farrukhi Sistani, who claimed to have accompanied Mahmud on his raid, Somnat (as rendered in Persian) was a garbled version of su-manat referring to the goddess Manat. According to him, as well as a later Ghaznavid historian Abu Sa'id Gardezi, the images of the other goddesses were destroyed in Arabia but the one of Manat was secretly sent away to Kathiawar (in modern Gujarat) for safekeeping. Since the idol of Manat was an aniconic image of black stone, it could have been easily confused with a lingam at Somnath. Mahmud is said to have broken the idol and taken away parts of it as loot and placed so that people would walk on it. In his letters to the Caliphate, Mahmud exaggerated the size, wealth and religious significance of the Somnath temple, receiving grandiose titles from the Caliph in return.

The wooden structure was replaced by Kumarapala (r. 1143–72), who rebuilt the temple out of stone.

Mamluk dynasty onward 
Historical records compiled by Muslim historian Maulana Hakim Saiyid Abdul Hai attest to the religious violence during the Mamluk dynasty under Qutb-ud-din Aybak. The first mosque built in Delhi, the "Quwwat al-Islam" was built with demolished parts of 20 Hindu and Jain temples. This pattern of iconoclasm was common during his reign.

During the Delhi Sultanate, a Muslim army led by Malik Kafur, a general of Alauddin Khalji, pursued four violent campaigns into south India, between 1309 and 1311, against the Hindu kingdoms of Devgiri (Maharashtra), Warangal (Telangana), Dwarasamudra (Karnataka) and Madurai (Tamil Nadu). Many Temples were plundered; Hoysaleswara Temple and others were ruthlessly destroyed.

In Kashmir, Sikandar Shah Miri (1389–1413) began expanding, and unleashed religious violence that earned him the name but-shikan, or 'idol-breaker'. He earned this sobriquet because of the sheer scale of desecration and destruction of Hindu and Buddhist temples, shrines, ashrams, hermitages, and other holy places in what is now known as Kashmir and its neighboring territories. Firishta states, "After the emigration of the Brahmins, Sikundur ordered all the temples in Kashmeer to be thrown down." He destroyed vast majority of Hindu and Buddhist temples in his reach in Kashmir region (north and northwest India).

In the 1460s, Kapilendra, founder of the Suryavamsi Gajapati dynasty, sacked the Shaiva and Vaishnava temples in the Cauvery delta in the course of wars of conquest in the Tamil country. Vijayanagara king Krishnadevaraya looted a Bala Krishna temple in Udayagiri in 1514, and looted a Vitthala temple in Pandharpur in 1520.

A regional tradition, along with the Hindu text Madala Panji, states that Kalapahar attacked and damaged the Konark Sun Temple
in 1568, as well as many others in Orissa.

Some of the most dramatic cases of iconoclasm by Muslims are found in parts of India where Hindu and Buddhist temples were razed and mosques erected in their place. Aurangzeb, the 6th Mughal Emperor, destroyed the famous Hindu temples at Varanasi and Mathura, turning back on his ancestor Akbar's policy of religious freedom and establishing Sharia across his empire.

During Goa Inquisition

Exact data on the nature and number of Hindu temples destroyed by the Christian missionaries and Portuguese government are unavailable. Some 160 temples were razed to the ground in Tiswadi (Ilhas de Goa) by 1566. Between 1566 and 1567, a campaign by Franciscan missionaries destroyed another 300 Hindu temples in Bardez (North Goa). In Salcete (South Goa), approximately another 300 Hindu temples were destroyed by the Christian officials of the Inquisition. Numerous Hindu temples were destroyed elsewhere at Assolna and Cuncolim by Portuguese authorities. A 1569 royal letter in Portuguese archives records that all Hindu temples in its colonies in India had been burnt and razed to the ground.

In modern India

The most high-profile case was in 1992. Hindus, led by the Vishva Hindu Parishad and Bajrang Dal, destroyed the 430-year-old Islamic Babri Masjid in Ayodhya which was built after destroying the Ram Mandir. This was to reclaim their temple which was destroyed by Islamic iconoclasts.

Iconoclasm in East Asia

China 

There have been a number of anti-Buddhist campaigns in Chinese history that led to the destruction of Buddhist temples and images. One of the most notable of these campaigns was the Great Anti-Buddhist Persecution of the Tang dynasty.

During and after the 1911 Xinhai Revolution, there was widespread destruction of religious and secular images in China.

During the Northern Expedition in Guangxi in 1926, Kuomintang General Bai Chongxi led his troops in destroying Buddhist temples and smashing Buddhist images, turning the temples into schools and Kuomintang party headquarters. It was reported that almost all of the viharas in Guangxi were destroyed and the monks were removed. Bai also led a wave of anti-foreignism in Guangxi, attacking Americans, Europeans, and other foreigners, and generally making the province unsafe for foreigners and missionaries. Westerners fled from the province and some Chinese Christians were also attacked as imperialist agents. The three goals of the movement were anti-foreignism, anti-imperialism and anti-religion. Bai led the anti-religious movement against superstition. Huang Shaohong, also a Kuomintang member of the New Guangxi clique, supported Bai's campaign. The anti-religious campaign was agreed upon by all Guangxi Kuomintang members.

There was extensive destruction of religious and secular imagery in Tibet after it was invaded and occupied by China.

Many religious and secular images were destroyed during the Cultural Revolution of 1966–1976, ostensibly because they were a holdover from China's traditional past (which the Communist regime led by Mao Zedong reviled). The Cultural Revolution included widespread destruction of historic artworks in public places and private collections, whether religious or secular. Objects in state museums were mostly left intact.

South Korea 
According to an article in Buddhist-Christian Studies:Over the course of the last decade [1990s] a fairly large number of Buddhist temples in South Korea have been destroyed or damaged by fire by Christian fundamentalists. More recently, Buddhist statues have been identified as idols, and attacked and decapitated in the name of Jesus. Arrests are hard to effect, as the arsonists and vandals work by stealth of night.

Angkor 

Beginning around 1243 AD with the death of Indravarman II, the Khmer Empire went through a period of iconoclasm. At the beginning of the reign of the next king, Jayavarman VIII, the Kingdom went back to Hinduism and the worship of Shiva. Many of the Buddhist images were destroyed by Jayavarman VIII, who reestablished previously Hindu shrines that had been converted to Buddhism by his predecessor. Carvings of the Buddha at temples such as Preah Khan were destroyed, and during this period the Bayon Temple was made a temple to Shiva, with the central 3.6 meter tall statue of the Buddha cast to the bottom of a nearby well.

Political iconoclasm

Damnatio memoriae

Revolutions and changes of regime, whether through uprising of the local population, foreign invasion, or a combination of both, are often accompanied by the public destruction of statues and monuments identified with the previous regime. This may also be known as damnatio memoriae, the ancient Roman practice of official obliteration of the memory of a specific individual. Stricter definitions of "iconoclasm" exclude both types of action, reserving the term for religious or more widely cultural destruction. In many cases, such as Revolutionary Russia or Ancient Egypt, this distinction can be hard to make.

Among Roman emperors and other political figures subject to decrees of damnatio memoriae were Sejanus, Publius Septimius Geta, and Domitian. Several Emperors, such as Domitian and Commodus had during their reigns erected numerous statues of themselves, which were pulled down and destroyed when they were overthrown.

The perception of damnatio memoriae in the Classical world was an act of erasing memory has been challenged by scholars who have argued that it "did not negate historical traces, but created gestures which served to dishonor the record of the person and so, in an oblique way, to confirm memory," and was in effect a spectacular display of "pantomime forgetfulness." Examining cases of political monument destruction in modern Irish history, Guy Beiner has demonstrated that iconoclastic vandalism often entails subtle expressions of ambiguous remembrance and that, rather than effacing memory, such acts of de-commemorating effectively preserve memory in obscure forms.

During the French Revolution

Throughout the radical phase of the French Revolution, iconoclasm was supported by members of the government as well as the citizenry. Numerous monuments, religious works, and other historically significant pieces were destroyed in an attempt to eradicate any memory of the Old Regime. A statue of King Louis XV in the Paris square which until then bore his name, was pulled down and destroyed. This was a prelude to the guillotining of his successor Louis XVI in the same site, renamed "Place de la Révolution" (at present Place de la Concorde). Later that year, the bodies of many French kings were exhumed from the Basilica of Saint-Denis and dumped in a mass grave.

Some episodes of iconoclasm were carried out spontaneously by crowds of citizens, including the destruction of statues of kings during the insurrection of 10 August 1792 in Paris. Some were directly sanctioned by the Republican government, including the Saint-Denis exhumations. Nonetheless, the Republican government also took steps to preserve historic artworks, notably by founding the Louvre museum to house and display the former royal art collection. This allowed the physical objects and national heritage to be preserved while stripping them of their association with the monarchy. Alexandre Lenoir saved many royal monuments by diverting them to preservation in a museum.

The statue of Napoleon on the column at Place Vendôme, Paris was also the target of iconoclasm several times: destroyed after the Bourbon Restoration, restored by Louis-Philippe, destroyed during the Paris Commune and restored by Adolphe Thiers.

Other examples 

Other examples of political destruction of images include:
 There have been several cases of removing symbols of past rulers in Malta's history. Many Hospitaller coats of arms on buildings were defaced during the French occupation of Malta in 1798–1800; a few of these were subsequently replaced by British coats of arms in the early 19th century. Some British symbols were also removed by the government after Malta became a republic in 1974. These include royal cyphers being ground off from post boxes, and British coats of arms such as that on the Main Guard building being temporarily obscured (but not destroyed).
 With the entry of the Ottoman Empire to the First World War, the Ottoman Army destroyed the Russian victory monument erected in San Stefano (the modern Yeşilköy quarter of Istanbul) to commemorate the Russian victory in the Russo-Turkish War of 1877–1878. The demolition was filmed by former army officer Fuat Uzkınay, producing Ayastefanos'taki Rus Abidesinin Yıkılışı—the oldest known Turkish-made film.
 In the late 18th century, the Brabant Revolutionaries sacked Brussels' Grand-Place, destroying statues of nobility and symbols of Christianity. In the 19th century, the place was renovated and many new statues added. In 1911, a marble commemoration for the Spanish freethinker and educator Francisco Ferrer, executed two years earlier and widely considered a martyr, was erected in the Grand-Place. The statue depicted a nude man holding the Torch of Enlightenment. The Imperial German military, which occupied Belgium during the First World War, disliked the monument and destroyed it in 1915. It was restored in 1926 by the International Free Thought Movement.
 In 1942 the pro-Nazi Vichy Government of France took down and melted Clothilde Roch's statue of the 16th-century dissident intellectual Michael Servetus, who had been burned at the stake in Geneva at the instigation of Calvin. The Vichy authorities disliked the statue, as it was a celebration of freedom of conscience. In 1960, having found the original molds, the municipality of Annemasse had it recast and returned the statue to its previous place.
 A sculpture of the head of Spanish intellectual Miguel de Unamuno by Victorio Macho was installed in the City Hall of Bilbao, Spain. It was withdrawn in 1936 when Unamuno showed temporary support for the Nationalist side. During the Spanish Civil War, it was thrown into the estuary. It was later recovered. In 1984 the head was installed in Plaza Unamuno. It was substituted by a copy in 2000 after the original was located in the water.
 The Battle of Baghdad and the regime of Saddam Hussein symbolically ended with the Firdos Square statue destruction, a U.S. military-staged event on April 9, 2003 where a prominent statue of Saddam Hussein was pulled down. Subsequently, statues and murals of Saddam Hussein all over Iraq were destroyed by US occupation forces as well as Iraqi citizens.
 In 2016, paintings from the University of Cape Town were burned in student protests as symbols of colonialism.
 In November 2019 the statue of Swedish footballer Zlatan Ibrahimović was vandalized by Malmö FF supporters after he announced he had become part-owner of Swedish rivals Hammarby. White paint was sprayed on it; threats and hateful messages towards Zlatan were written on the statue, and it was burned. In a second attack the nose was sawed off and the statue was sprinkled with chrome paint. On 5 January 2020 it was finally toppled.
 On June 4, 2020, Virginia governor Ralph Northam ordered the monument to Robert E. Lee in Richmond to be removed in response to George Floyd protests. It was removed on September 8, 2021.

In the Soviet Union

During and after the October Revolution, widespread destruction of religious and secular imagery in Russia took place, as well as the destruction of imagery related to the Imperial family. The Revolution was accompanied by destruction of monuments of tsars, as well as the destruction of imperial eagles at various locations throughout Russia. According to Christopher Wharton:In front of a Moscow cathedral, crowds cheered as the enormous statue of Tsar Alexander III was bound with ropes and gradually beaten to the ground. After a considerable amount of time, the statue was decapitated and its remaining parts were broken into rubble.The Soviet Union actively destroyed religious sites, including Russian Orthodox churches and Jewish cemeteries, in order to discourage religious practice and curb the activities of religious groups.

During the Hungarian Revolution of 1956 and during the Revolutions of 1989, protesters often attacked and took down sculptures and images of Joseph Stalin, such as the Stalin Monument in Budapest.

The fall of Communism in 1989-1991 was also followed by the destruction or removal of statues of Vladimir Lenin and other Communist leaders in the former Soviet Union and in other Eastern Bloc countries. Particularly well-known was the destruction of "Iron Felix", the statue of Felix Dzerzhinsky outside the KGB's headquarters. Another statue of Dzerzhinsky was destroyed in a Warsaw square that was named after him during communist rule, but which is now called Bank Square.

In the United States 
During the American Revolution, the Sons of Liberty pulled down and destroyed the gilded lead statue of George III of the United Kingdom on Bowling Green (New York City), melting it down to be recast as ammunition. Similar acts have accompanied the independence of most ex-colonial territories. Sometimes relatively intact monuments are moved to a collected display in a less prominent place, as in India and also post-Communist countries.

In August 2017, a statue of a Confederate soldier dedicated to "the boys who wore the gray" was pulled down from its pedestal in front of Durham County Courthouse in North Carolina by protesters. This followed the events at the 2017 Unite the Right rally in response to growing calls to remove Confederate monuments and memorials across the U.S.

2020 demonstrations 

During the George Floyd protests of 2020, demonstrators pulled down dozens of statues which they considered symbols of the Confederacy, slavery, segregation, or racism, including the statue of Williams Carter Wickham in Richmond, Virginia

Further demonstrations in the wake of the George Floyd protests have resulted in the removal of:
 the John Breckenridge Castleman monument in Louisville, Kentucky;
 plaques in Jacksonville, Florida's Hemming Park (renamed in 1899 in honor of Civil War veteran Charles C. Hemming), which were in remembrance of deceased Confederate soldiers;
 the monumental obelisk of the Confederate Soldiers and Sailors Monument and a statue of Charles Linn in Linn Park, Birmingham, Alabama;
 a statue of Junípero Serra in Golden Gate Park, San Francisco;
 a statue of Confederate Gen. Robert E. Lee in Montgomery, Alabama;
 the Appomattox statue in Alexandria, Virginia, leaving the monument's base empty but intact.

Multiple statues of early European explorers and founders were also vandalized, including those of Christopher Columbus, George Washington, and Thomas Jefferson.
 Christopher Columbus was removed in Virginia, Minnesota, Chicago and beheaded in Boston MA.
 George Washington statue was toppled in Portland, Oregon.

A statue of the African-American abolitionist statesman Frederick Douglass was vandalised in Rochester, New York, by being torn from its base and left close to a nearby river gorge. Donald Trump attributed the act to anarchists, but he did not substantiate his claim nor did he offer a theory on motive. Cornell William Brooks, former president of the NAACP, theorised that this was an act of revenge from white supremacists. Carvin Eison, who led the project that brought the Douglass statues to Rochester, thought it was unlikely that the Douglass statue was toppled by someone who was upset about monuments honoring Confederate figures, and added that "it's only logical that it was some kind of retaliation event in someone’s mind". Police did not find evidence that supported or refuted either claim, and the vandalism case remains unsolved.

See also
 Aniconism
 Censorship by religion
 Cultural Revolution
 Iconolatry
 List of destroyed heritage
 Lost artworks
 Natural theology
 Slighting
 Council of Constantinople (843)

Notes

References

Further reading
  (On the conceptual background of Byzantine iconoclasm)
 
 —— 2016. Broken Idols of the English Reformation. Cambridge University Press.
 
 Barasch, Moshe. 1992. Icon: Studies in the History of an Idea. New York University Press. .
 
 Besançon, Alain. 2000. The Forbidden Image: An Intellectual History of Iconoclasm. University of Chicago Press. .
 Bevan, Robert. 2006. The Destruction of Memory: Architecture at War. Reaktion Books. .
 Boldrick, Stacy, Leslie Brubaker, and Richard Clay, eds. 2014. Striking Images, Iconoclasms Past and Present. Ashgate. (Scholarly studies of the destruction of images from prehistory to the Taliban.)
 Calisi, Antonio. 2017. I Difensori Dell'icona: La Partecipazione Dei Vescovi Dell'Italia Meridionale Al Concilio Di Nicea II 787. CreateSpace. .
 Freedberg, David. 1977. "The Structure of Byzantine and European Iconoclasm." Pp. 165–77 in Iconoclasm: Papers Given at the Ninth Spring Symposium of Byzantine Studies, edited by A. Bryer and J. Herrin. University of Birmingham, Centre for Byzantine Studies. .
 —— [1985] 1993. "Iconoclasts and their Motives," (Second Horst Gerson Memorial Lecture, University of Groningen). Public 8(Fall).
 Original print: Maarssen: Gary Schwartz. 1985. .
 
 
 
 
 
 
 Shourie, Arun, Sita Ram Goel, Harsh Narain, Jay Dubashi, and Ram Swarup. 1990. Hindu Temples - What Happened to Them Vol. I, (A Preliminary Survey).  
 
 Topper, David R. Idolatry & Infinity: Of Art, Math & God. BrownWalker. .
 
 Weeraratna, Senaka ' Repression of Buddhism in Sri Lanka by the Portuguese' (1505 -1658)
 Teodoro Studita, Contro gli avversari delle icone, Emanuela Fogliadini (Prefazione), Antonio Calisi (Traduttore), Jaca Book, 2022,

External links

 Iconoclasm in England, Holy Cross College (UK)
 Design as Social Agent at the ICA by Kerry Skemp, April 5, 2009
 Hindu temples destroyed by Muslim rulers in India

 
 
Protestant Reformation
Religious persecution
Christian terminology